Hyperspace is a faster-than-light method of traveling used in science fiction.

Hyperspace or HyperSpace may also refer to:

Mathematics
 Hypertopology, a topological space within which some of its elements form another topological space
 Higher dimensions, including Kaluza–Klein's 4-dimensional space and Superstring theory's 9-dimensional space and Supergravity/M-theory's 10-dimensional space
 n-dimensional space, the original meaning of the word hyperspace, common in late nineteenth century British books
 Non-Euclidean space

Media

Books
 Hyperspace (book), a 1994 book by Michio Kaku that attempts to explain the possibility of 10-dimensional space using string theory
 Hyperspace (gamebook), a book in the Choose Your Own Adventure series

Film and television
 Hyperspace (film), a 1984 3D science fiction comedy film
 Hyperspace, the U.S. title of Space, a 2001 BBC documentary

Music
 Hyperspace, the opening song on the Nada Surf album The Proximity Effect
 Hyperspace, 2019 studio album by American producer and musician Beck
 Hyperspace, a song by Buckner & Garcia from the album Pac-Man Fever

Other uses
 The hypertextual or architectural aspect of cyberspace
 Lost in hyperspace
 HyperSpace (software), an operating system by Phoenix Technologies

See also
 Hyper (disambiguation)
 Hiperspace, IBM High Performance Space
 Hyper Scape